Cadra is a genus of small moths belonging to the family Pyralidae. The genus Ephestia is closely related to Cadra and might be its senior synonym. Several of these moths are variously assigned to one or the other genus, in particular in non-entomological sources. Cadra and Ephestia belong to the huge snout moth subfamily Phycitinae, and therein to the tribe Phycitini.

Cadra species can usually be recognized by their reduced forewing venation: veins 4, 7 and 9 are missing, making for a total of nine veins in the forewing. Some members of this genus are significant pests of dry plant produce, such as seeds and nuts. The almond moth (C. cautella) is a well-known example of these.

Species
Species of Cadra include:
 Cadra abstersella (Zeller, 1847)
 Cadra acuta Horak, 1994
 Cadra calidella (Guenée, 1845) – dried fruit moth, carob moth
 Cadra cautella – almond moth
 Cadra corniculata Horak, 1994
 Cadra delattinella Roesler, 1965
 Cadra figulilella – raisin moth
 Cadra furcatella (Herrich-Schäffer, 1849)
 Cadra furcatella afflatella
 Cadra furcatella calonella
 Cadra perfasciata Horak, 1994
 Cadra reniformis Horak, 1994
 Cadra rugosa Horak, 1994

Footnotes

References
  (1986): Pyralidae and Microlepidoptera of the Marquesas Archipelago. Smithsonian Contributions to Zoology 416: 1-485. PDF full text (214 MB!)
  (2009): Markku Savela's Lepidoptera and Some Other Life Forms – Cadra. Version of 14 April 2009. Retrieved 10 April 2010.

Phycitini
Pyralidae genera